James Perkins may refer to:

James Perkins Jr. (born 1952/53), current mayor of Selma, Alabama
James Alfred Perkins (1911–1998), political scientist and president of Cornell University
James Ashbrook Perkins, professor of literature at Westminster College, Pennsylvania
James Breck Perkins (1847–1919), historian and US Congressman
James H. Perkins, chairman of Citigroup
James Woodbury Perkins (1840–1892), American politician in Wisconsin
Jim Perkins, character in 1967 film It
Jim Perkins (American football)
Jim Perkins (racing driver)
Jimmy Perkins, character
Jim Perkins (rugby union coach)

See also
James Perkin (disambiguation)